Fly-in fly-out (FIFO) work practices in Australia occur amongst various professions primarily associated within the resources industry as well as medical and related health services. Following the recession of the 1980s, Australia has experienced a resources boom that has seen thousands of families impacted by FIFO work.  The FIFO lifestyle often sees workers on a scheduled roster flying to remote locations. Workers live in serviced accommodation, working long days.

While working in the mining and resource sector is financially rewarding, the type of lifestyle it leads is far different than the life workers have at home. As a result of this type of work, there is an impact on individuals, couples and family units that can account for the emotional health and well-being seen in workers.

Background of mining in Australia 
Australia is one of the leading mining nations in the world, with large scale extraction of mineral sands, brown coal, nickel, zinc, lead, and uranium.

Increases in worldwide demand for resources have resulted in Australia's annual mining production has more than doubling in the 20 years up to 2008. There are approximately 365 operating mines in Australia, and as for the employment of up to 269,000 people, the mining and resource industry contributes 121.5 billion dollars to the economy. Thus plays a significant role to Australia's wealth.

Effects of mental health in workers 
The World Health Organization (WHO) has described mental health as "a state of wellbeing in which every individual realises his or her potential, can cope with normal stresses of life, can work productively and fruitfully, and is able to make a contribution to her or his community" (2014). It is acknowledged that people working in rural and remote mining and resource operations confront psychological and emotional demands that create unique challenges for both men and women. The key mental health issues across the resource mining sector includes feelings such as isolation and loneliness, due to the remoteness of living on-site and from family and friends. Stress, anxiety and depression are major factors which are likely to influence employment performance and antisocial conduct. This is predicted to get worse for some people during the transition period from home to work, and can potentially increase the risk of self-harm and suicide.

Types of stress in FIFO workers 
Along with the stresses of being away from home, other stresses FIFO workers experience include:
 On-site physical exertion and fatigue
 On-site extreme heat
 Staying hydrated 
 Adapting to night shifts and between day and night shifts
 Job insecurity
 Following on-site safety rules
 Transitioning back home
 Maintaining home (i.e. gardens, bills) during work absences
 Minimal communication and/or internet access on some sites

Factors influencing FIFO mental health and suicide 
 Employment, living and working conditions
 Physical health, fatigue and sleep problems
 Family imbalance
 Substance misuse 
 Financial issues 
 Domestic violence 
 Sexual health issues 
 Male dominance in workplace culture 
 Non effective coping strategies

Challenges of the FIFO work system

Rosters and fatigue 
The FIFO lifestyle is based upon a roster, typically a fortnight on and one week off. However, more remote mining sites require month on and month off rosters, attributable to the incremented time and costs of flying to and from remote areas. As expected, FIFO workers are implemented work long shifts, usually ranging from 12- up to 18-hour shifts.

As reported by Meredith, Rush & Robinson (2014) it is notable that the longer work length than to time on leave has more deleterious effects on the workers' wellbeing and can lead to a vulnerable mental state. Physical health allows for a positive mental health as well as the capability to handle the demands of FIFO work. The length of 12 hour or more shifts with short breaks, make is arduous for workers to relax and involve themselves in effective coping strategies such as getting enough sleep, exercising and socialising, in dealing with daily stresses. In conclusion occupational fatigue may occur as frequent recovery is confined.

Workplace culture 
On-site mining workplace culture is considered a problem in reinforcing positive mental health and seeking support behavior. Unfortunately many workers do not seek formal help due to the general outlook held by the wider population of fear and stigma in seeking support for mental health issues.

Male dominancy significantly contributes to the mining workplace culture, where females may experience tensions fitting within the FIFO civilisation. The masculine culture consequently affects the relationships with other workers, negative feelings suppression or bullying behavior that is a negative subside of poor mental health. Commendations include creating a fair and just workplace environment for both men and women, for instance The Australian Mines and Metal Solidarity are taking action to improve the number of women to 20% by 2020.

Workers who do not seek emotional support may experience adverse impacts and result in poor work output and increased isolation. An organisational culture is vital, in order to proposer relevant approaches for workers in acknowledging when to seek help.

Personal relationships 
Over the past 20 years FIFO had become a prevalent mining industry practice, however on the subject matter there is a scarcity of Australian research. According to Arnold (1995) studies resulted in FIFO being problematic for some families, in an analysis of the impacts on the lifestyle and families of workers. The Australian FIFO personnel indicate the benefits of leisure, access to services and facilities swell as friends and extended family from relatively high earnings from working in the industry. However, observation conducted by Gillies et al. (1997) involved surveying fifteen Australian FIFO operations and out of a study sample of 227 employees, a total of 30% employees stated their families were not in favour of the FIFO lifestyle. Additionally results included 25% of employees believed their family relationships had been earnestly disadvantaged by the FIFO employment.

The structure of rostered schedules and continuous cycles such as four weeks away and one week home, the long separations and short homecomings provoke an increased amount of conflict between work and home. In accordance to Torkington, Larkins & Sen Gupta (2011) "Miners reported that when they were away their partner described: being upset or lonely; the stresses of dealing with busy roles, such as parenting, alone; the challenge of changing routines; and having to managing practical tasks (e.g. mechanical repairs), which fell outside their normal role." (2011). As a result, the family structure is altered, especially for those with younger children.

References

Mental health in Australia
Commuting
Ethically disputed working conditions
Economy of Western Australia
Aviation in Australia
Aviation in Western Australia
Mining in Australia
Economy of Queensland